Samuel Dickinson Burchard (July 17, 1836 – September 1, 1901) was an American farmer, businessman, and Democratic politician.  He represented Wisconsin's 5th congressional district in the 44th U.S. Congress, and served four years in the Wisconsin State Senate.

Biography

Born in Leyden, New York, Burchard moved to Beaver Dam, Wisconsin with his father Charles Burchard in 1845, attended Madison University and engaged in the manufacturing of wool in Beaver Dam. He relocated to Missouri, where he started managing a plantation in 1856 and raising livestock and then purchased a coal mine before returning to Beaver Dam in 1858. He married Mary Jan Simmons (1839–1883) in 1859. At the outbreak of the Civil War, he entered the Union Army as a lieutenant in the Missouri State Militia, was later appointed assistant quartermaster of volunteers with the rank of captain, being stationed in New York, and was mustered out with the rank of major. Burchard served in the Wisconsin Senate from 1872 to 1874.

Burchard served as mayor of Beaver Dam in 1871, and from 1872 to 1874 he was a member of the Wisconsin Senate. He was elected a Democrat to the United States House of Representatives in 1874 to the 44th United States Congress, serving from March 4, 1875 until March 3, 1877. He served as the representative of Wisconsin's 5th congressional district. Afterwards, he engaged in agricultural pursuits until his death in Greenwood, Texas on September 1, 1901. He was interred in Greenwood Cemetery in Greenwood.

References

External links

 Retrieved on 2008-07-18

Samuel D. Burchard at the Wisconsin Historical Society

1836 births
1901 deaths
Democratic Party Wisconsin state senators
Union Army officers
Colgate University alumni
People from Lewis County, New York
People from Wise County, Texas
People of Wisconsin in the American Civil War
Politicians from Beaver Dam, Wisconsin
Democratic Party members of the United States House of Representatives from Wisconsin
19th-century American politicians
Military personnel from Texas